William Hoffman may refer to:

 William Hoffman (author) (1925–2009), American novelist
 William M. Hoffman (1939–2017), American playwright
 Bill Hoffman (baseball) (1918–2004), American baseball player
 Billy Hoffman (singer), American country music artist
 Bill Hoffman (American football) (1902–1994), American football player
 Bill Hoffman (bowling) (born 1971), ten-pin bowler
 Bill Hoffman, one of the original developers of CMake and vice president of Kitware
 William Hoffman (United States Army) (1807–1884), American military officer, led the Colorado River Expedition of 1858–1859 against the Mohave
 Sonny Hoffman (William A. Hoffman, 1853–?), baseball player
 Bill Hoffman, candidate in the United States House of Representatives elections in Washington, 2010